The Georgian Troupe is a left-wing Georgian opposition political party with a strong nationalist component set up in January 2007 and chaired by Jondi Bagaturia, formerly a leading activist of the Georgian Labour Party. Bagaturia left the Labour Party following his disagreement with the party leader Shalva Natelashvili in December 2006. The party has promised to nationalize companies and property bought by foreigners. It has been part of the United Opposition alliance since November 2007.

References

2007 establishments in Georgia (country)
Georgian nationalism
Nationalist parties in Georgia (country)
Political parties established in 2007
Political parties in Georgia (country)